Eubranchus vascoi is a species of sea slug or nudibranch, a marine gastropod mollusc in the family Eubranchidae.

Distribution
This species was described from São Pedro, São Miguel Island, Azores, Portugal. It is reported from La Tejita, Tenerife, Canary Islands.

References

Eubranchidae
Gastropods described in 2002